Festuca laxa is a species of grass in the family Poaceae. It is native to Austria and Yugoslavia. It is perennial and mainly grows in temperate biomes. It was first published in 1802.

References

laxa
Plants described in 1802
Flora of Austria
Flora of Yugoslavia